The 1991 Soviet Cup Final was a football match that took place at the Lenin's Central Stadium, Moscow on 23 June 1991. The match was the jubilee 50th Soviet Cup Final and it was contested by PFC CSKA Moscow and FC Torpedo Moscow. The Soviet Cup winner CSKA qualified for the Cup Winners' Cup first round for the Soviet Union. CSKA played their 7th Cup Final winning on 5 occasions including this one. For Torpedo it was their 15th Cup Final and for the ninth time they were defeated at this stage.

This match was the final match played by CSKA and USSR national team goalkeeper Mikhail Yeriomin.  Yeriomin was in a serious car accident the evening after the final and died at a hospital on 30 June 1991 from his injuries.

Road to Moscow 

All sixteen Soviet Top League clubs did not have to go through qualification to get into the competition, so CSKA and Torpedo both qualified for the competition automatically.  The last year defending champions Dynamo Kyiv were eliminated administratively in the first round of the competition (1/16 final) by FC Tekstilshchik Kamyshin after winning their home game 7–1 (later changed to -:+).

Previous encounters 
Previously these two teams met each other in the early editions of the competition on several occasions. However this was their first time and the last that they met in the finals of the Soviet Cup. Previously their contested each other four times in semifinals of this competition since 1944.

Match summary

MATCH OFFICIALS
Assistant referees:
 Andrei Butenko (Moscow)
 Anatoliy Maliarov (Moscow)
Fourth official: 

MATCH RULES
90 minutes.
30 minutes of extra-time if necessary.
Penalty shoot-out if scores still level.
Seven named substitutes
Maximum of 3 substitutions.

See also
 Soviet Top League 1990

References

External links 
The competition calendar

1991
Cup
Soviet Cup Final 1991
Soviet Cup Final 1991
June 1991 sports events in Russia
1991 in Moscow